The Dacian fortress of Viişoara Moşneni was a Dacian fortified town.

References

Dacian fortresses in Dolj County